The Little Kentucky River is a tributary of the Ohio River, approximately  long, in northern Kentucky in the United States.

It follows a winding course generally north across Trimble and Carroll counties.

See also
 List of rivers of Kentucky

References

External links
Little Kentucky River Project

Rivers of Kentucky
Tributaries of the Ohio River
Rivers of Trimble County, Kentucky
Rivers of Carroll County, Kentucky
Rivers of Henry County, Kentucky